Wyoming Highway 190 (WYO 190) is a  state highway in Johnson County, Wyoming.

Route description
Wyoming Highway 190 begins its western end at the small settlement of Barnum, located southwest of Kaycee. Named Barnum Road, Highway 190 travels roughly east-northeast toward Kaycee following the Middle Fork of the Powder River. At 9.66 miles, WYO 190 reaches it eastern end at Wyoming Highway 191 (Mayoworth Road) in Kaycee. 
Exit 254 of I-25/US 87 can be accessed via WYO 191 less than a mile east of Highway 190's terminus.

Wyoming Highway 190 provides access to the Middle Fork Recreation Area near Barnum.

Major intersections

References

External links

Wyoming Routes 100-199
WYO 190 - WYO 191 to Barnum
Transportation in Johnson County, Wyoming
190